Leopards are members of the family Felidae.

Leopards may also refer to:

 AC Léopards, a football club from the Republic of Congo
 A.F.C. Leopards, a Kenyan football club
 African Leopards, an African rugby union representative team
 Cincinnati Leopards, an American women's soccer club 
 Dongguan Leopards, a Chinese basketball team, now Shenzhen Aviators
 Essex Leopards, a British basketball team from 2004, also known as Essex & Herts Leopards and London Leopards
Essex Leopards (1994–2003)
 Golf Leopards F.C., a Sierra Leonean football club
 Guangdong Leopards, a Chinese baseball team
 Islamabad Leopards, a Pakistani domestic cricket team
 Lafayette Leopards, 23 varsity athletic teams of Lafayette College, Pennsylvania, U.S.
 Leigh Leopards, an English rugby league club
 Leopardos de Santa Clara ('Santa Clara Leopards'), a Cuban baseball team 
 Leopards (rugby union), a South African rugby team
 Léopards de Transfoot, a Madagascan football club
 Lewisville Leopards, an American basketball team 
 Liaoning Flying Leopards, a Chinese basketball team 
 Liverpool Leopards, an English ice hockey club
 Nakambala Leopards F.C., a Zambian football club
 Nangarhar Leopards, an Afghan franchise cricket team
 Otahuhu Leopards, a New Zealand rugby league club
 SAARB Leopards (rugby union), a South African rugby team
 Sochi Leopards, nickname of HC Sochi, a Russian ice hockey team 
 Tamaki Leopards, later Tamaki Titans, a New Zealand rugby league team
 Villeneuve Leopards, nickname of Villeneuve XIII RLLG, a French rugby league club

See also
 
 Leopard (disambiguation)
 Leopardi (disambiguation)